ISPConfig is a widely used open source hosting control panel for Linux, licensed under BSD license and developed by the company ISPConfig UG. The ISPConfig project was started in autumn 2005 by Till Brehm from the German company projektfarm GmbH.

Overview
Using the dashboard, administrators have the ability to manage websites, email addresses, MySQL and MariaDB databases, FTP accounts, Shell accounts and DNS records through a web-based interface. The software has 4 login levels: administrator, reseller, client, and email-user, each with a different set of permissions.

Operating Systems
ISPConfig is only available on Linux, with CentOS, Debian, and Ubuntu being among the supported distributions.

Features
The following services and features are supported:

Manage single or multiple servers from one control panel.
Web server management for Apache HTTP Server and Nginx.
Mail server management (with virtual mail users) with spam and antivirus filter using Postfix (software) and Dovecot (software).
DNS server management (BIND, Powerdns).
Configuration mirroring and clusters.
Administrator, reseller, client and mail-user login.
Virtual server management for OpenVZ Servers.
Website statistics using Webalizer and AWStats
See feature list for a more detailed list.

See also

Web hosting control panel
Comparison of web hosting control panels

References

External links
ISPConfig Developer Resource Homepage
SourceForge Project Homepage
ISPConfig GIT Server
ISPConfig Installation Tutorials

Internet hosting
Web applications
Web hosting
Website management
Web server management software
Software using the BSD license